Lee is a hamlet and civil parish in the Test Valley district of Hampshire, England. Its nearest town is Romsey, which lies approximately 3.7 miles (4.5 km) north from the hamlet. Lee is home to the Mountbatten Gallery previously Lee church built in 1862. The building's life as a gallery began in 1979. Across the road from the gallery are estate cottages designed by William Eden Nesfield dating from 1869.

References

Hamlets in Hampshire